The 1886 Southern Rugby Football Union season was the 13th season of the Sydney Rugby Premiership. This was the fourth competition for the Gardiner Challenge Cup which was awarded to the winners of the premiership. The football season was from May till September 1886. The season culminated in the premiership, which was won by Gordon who were newly formed at the beginning of the year. Gordon were crowned premiers by a committee of the Union.

Teams 
For the 1886 season, the Union decided to elevate 5 Junior clubs into the senior competition. Albion, Balmain Wellington, Glebe, Parramatta and Rosedale had performed well during the previous season. In addition, they also included 3 regional clubs from Newcastle, Bathurst and Goulburn. These clubs had successfully competed against metropolitan clubs prior to their admission. A new club, exclusively for New Zealand players, was formed and successfully petitioned to be included in the senior competition. This club took on the name Gordon. Many of their players had competed previously for other clubs. After poor performance during the previous season, the St. Leonards club was not reformed and thus did not participate in the Gardiner Challenge Cup.

Rule Changes
With the addition of regional clubs and the promotion of junior clubs, the Sydney Rugby Premiership saw sixteen teams compete for the Gardiner Challenge Cup. This increase in teams competing for the cup caused many of the senior clubs to limit their games to only those which would count towards the final results. Previous competitions between junior and senior clubs were thus rare. Growing crowd numbers saw games moving from the open Moore Park to more enclosed fields. The Royal Agricultural Society of NSW arranged for three fields to be available upon their grounds, however the third area was of poor quality. The Association Cricket Ground was made available from July.

Season Summary
In their first season of football, the Gordon Football Club performed well against the more established senior clubs. In fifteen games, the club was only defeated once by the Balmain team. Amongst their victories during the season, Gordon had defeated Sydney University, Redfern, Burwood and Wallaroo who were amongst the best teams. Much of their success was attributed to their captain, James O'Donnell. At the conclusion of the season a committee of the union awarded Gordon the premiership with Sydney University recognised as coming second.

In 1885, Balmain Wellington had been the premier junior club. Now in the senior ranks, the club performed well displaying improvement as the season progressed. Many of their games were played on inferior grounds with the club not once playing on the Association Cricket Ground. the club had the benefit of all of their players remaining fit for the entire season. Their game against Gordon was a highlight of the year.

The new regional clubs that had been added to the premiership only played a handful of games. At a meeting of the Union in September, it was suggested that branch unions be formed in the Newcastle, Bathurst and Goulburn regions to deal with disputes.

Ladder

1886 Gardiner Challenge Cup

 The ladder shown above was calculated using results of games published in newspapers of the period. Only games indicated as Gardiner Challenge Cup games or games between cup teams were included. Games against non-cup teams were not included. Ladders published in newspapers of the period included games against teams not included in the cup. Inconsistencies occur between the ladders published and the results recorded. This may be due to the Union altering results as a result of protests.

Lower Grades 
In 1886, a Sydney businessman donated a cup for the development of a Junior Rugby Football competition. The MacGregor Junior Challenge Cup was open to clubs not participating in the senior competition. Fifteen clubs submitted applications to enter the competition. The competition was due to begin May 24 and run each Saturday until August 1. Each club was balloted with a game for each weekend. It was planned that the best 8 clubs would then be matched up with another ballot. The final for the MacGregor Cup occurred on 4th September between Oxford and Randwick. Oxford won the match 5 points to nil to win the cup.

Representative Games

Intercolonial Matches 
In late July, the Gardiner Cup took a break in order to play two matches against a visiting Queensland team. When the visitors arrived in Sydney, it was obvious that they were far larger and heavier than the local players. The first match saw showers, making the ground and ball slippery. During the game, when the play was of a more tight nature, the Queenslanders were dominate. However once the play moved into being more open, the two teams were more equal. In the end an exciting game saw Queensland victors 4 points to 2. After making some changes for the second match, New South Wales were superior to the Queensland team winning the match 26 points to 5.

The New South Wales Tour of New Zealand 
In 1886 a team of New South Wales players were chosen and sent to New Zealand to play a number of matches against the local teams. The NSW team departed Sydney at the conclusion of the Gardiner Cup. No games were scheduled to play against a New Zealand team with games being against only local clubs. Unfortunately, the tourists did not fare well with a number of disappointing results. The merit of sending a team of young and inexperienced players was questioned and it was hoped that the results would not cause opposing teams to not value the New South Wales rugby players.

Team & Player Records

Top 10 Point Scorers

Top 10 Try Scorers

Most points in a match (Team)

Greatest Winning Margin

Participating Clubs

References

External links 

 Sydney Club Rugby History.

1886 in Australian sport
1886 in rugby union
Rugby union competitions in New South Wales